Wojciech Stefan Roszkowski OOB (born 20 June 1947 in Warsaw), sometimes known by the pseudonym Andrzej Albert, is an influential right-wing Polish historian and politician. From 1990 to 1993, he served as vice-rector of Warsaw School of Economics and from 1994 to 2000, he was the Kościuszko Chair of Polish Studies at the University of Virginia, USA. In 2004, Roszkowski won election to the European Parliament from the Law and Justice Party for a five year term.

Works and reception 
Mariusz Turowski, a philosopher of historiography at University of Wrocław finds Roszkowski to be an influential exponent of the "patriotic school of Polish historiography" that gained status in post-Communist Poland; his works posited a "clash of civilization" between conservative Christian ethics and multicultural democracies. For him, the downfall of Western Civilzation originated in the Age of Enlightenment, once it negated the existence of God.

Daniel Blatman, writing in 1997, noted Roszkowski to be among a new generation of post-Communist historians who tried to portray Poles as the ideal victim of Nazism as well as communism, and exonerate them of all misdeeds — his monograph on post-War history of Poland portrayed the Kielce pogrom as a handiwork of Communist agents, rather than Poles, despite lack of supportive evidence.

In 2022, the PiS government allowed Roszkowski's  (1945–1979. History and Present Times) to be used in secondary schools; scholars noted the book to be a far-right tract that stigmatized IVF-conceived children and equated feminism with nazi ideology.

Bibliography
 Najnowsza historia Polski 1914–2002 (Newest History of Poland 1914–2002), 2003, .
 Historia Polski 1945–2005 (History of Poland 1945–2005), Wydawnictwo Naukowe PWN, 2006, .
 Droga przez mgłę (Walking through the fog), Instytut Jagielloński, 2006, .
 Świat Chrystusa (The world of Christ), Wydawnictwo Biały Kruk, 2016, .
 Mistrzowska gra Józefa Piłsudskiego (Józef Piłsudski's Mastergame), Wydawnictwo Biały Kruk, 2018, .
 Roztrzaskane Lustro – Upadek cywilizacji zachodniej (The Shattered Mirror – The Downfall of the Western Civilization), Wydawnictwo Biały Kruk, 2019, .
 Orlęta Lwowskie (Lwów Eaglets), Wydawnictwo Biały Kruk, 2019.
 Kierunek targowica – Polska 2005–2015 (Heading to targowica – Poland 2005–2015), Wydawnictwo Biały Kruk, 2019.

See also
 2004 European Parliament election in Poland

References

External links
 .

1947 births
Living people
Polish economists
Law and Justice MEPs
MEPs for Poland 2004–2009
Fellows of Collegium Invisibile
Recipients of the Silver Medal for Merit to Culture – Gloria Artis
Knights of the Order of Polonia Restituta
Academic staff of Collegium Civitas